HMS Thorn (N11) was a T-class submarine of the Royal Navy. She was laid down by Cammell Laird & Co Limited, Birkenhead and launched in March 1941.

Career

Thorn had a short-lived career, serving in the Mediterranean.

She also attacked an Italian convoy in the central Mediterranean, but failed to hit any ships.

On 7 August 1942 Thorn encountered the Italian torpedo boat Pegaso, escorting the steamer Istria from Benghazi, off southern Crete. Pegaso spotted an escorting aircraft machine-gunning the sea’s surface and moved in to investigate. Just four minutes after the aircraft’s attack the Pegaso picked up a sonar contact and carried out seven attacks after which contact was lost. Thorn failed to return from the patrol and is believed to have been lost in this attack.  She was declared overdue on 11 August 1942.

Notes

References
 
 

 

British T-class submarines of the Royal Navy
Ships built on the River Mersey
1941 ships
World War II submarines of the United Kingdom
Lost submarines of the United Kingdom
World War II shipwrecks in the Mediterranean Sea
Maritime incidents in August 1942
Ships lost with all hands
Submarines sunk by Italian warships